Bareeda District is a district in the northeastern Bari region of Somalia.

References

Districts of Somalia
Bari, Somalia